Horry Telephone Cooperative (HTC) is a telecommunications cooperative in Horry County, South Carolina, in the United States. It was founded in 1952 to serve the rural areas of Horry County where it was unprofitable for national telephone companies to provide service.

From 2006 the company offered a fiber-to-the-home service, marketed as HTC Bluewave.

On August 2, 2012, the company announced a 20-year naming rights deal for Student Recreation and Convocation Center of Coastal Carolina University, which was renamed the HTC Center.

Also in 2012, the company purchased Data Publishing Inc., a publisher of telephone directories, from Hargray Communications.

References

Business services companies established in 1952
Telecommunications companies of the United States
Companies based in South Carolina
Telephone cooperatives in the United States
American companies established in 1952 
Telecommunications companies established in 1952 
1952 establishments in South Carolina